Meher Ali (1 January 1941 - 17 May 1971) was a politician and community leader from Netrokona, East Pakistan, known for his local leadership during the Bengali nationalist movements in East Pakistan and his assassination at the onset of Bangladesh liberation war.

Early life
Meher Ali was born on 1 January 1941 at Netrakona Sadar Upazila in Netrokona District of the then British India (now Bangladesh) to Md Akter Ali and  Musammat Tulajan Bibi.

Ali went to Anjuman Adarsha Government High School, Datta High school and Netrakona Govt College for secondary and higher secondary education respectively. He received a Bachelor of Science (soil science) degree from University of Dhaka.

Political career 
Meher Ali was the founding president of the Netrokona branches of East Pakistan Student League and East Pakistan Labour League.  Netrakona Branch.   He was also elected the labour Secretary of East Pakistan Awami league, Netrakona Branch, a position he held until death in 1971. Meher Ali led the building of the first Shaheed Minar in the Netrokona area, a monument to the martyrs of Bengali language movement of 1952.  He also founded two youth organizations-- Kochikachar Mela and Jubojagoron samiti, which played vital roles in the organization of protests in Netrokona during 1969 East Pakistan mass uprising.

Bangladesh Liberation war and assassination
At the onset of Bangladesh liberation war in 1971, Meher Ali helped organize a local resistance group (Muktisangram Parishad). The group set up a temporary camp at Meher Ali's father-in-law's residence at Dugnai Village, Moddhonogor Thana, which was used by Mukti bahini for recruitment and shelter.    On 17 April 1971, Meher Ali was abducted from the camp and was later executed in Maheshkhola by the collaborators of Pakistan army.

Legacy
The government of Bangladesh named "Muktijuddah Meher Ali Road" in Netrakona Sadar Upojilla in commemoration of his contribution to the Bangali nationalist movement in Pakistan and his sacrifice in the liberation war.

References

1941 births
1971 deaths
People from Netrokona District